The East Rim darter (Etheostoma orientale) is a species of freshwater ray-finned fish, a darter from the subfamily Etheostomatinae, part of the family Percidae, which also contains the perches, ruffes and pikeperches. It is  endemic to the eastern United States. The species has a range of 400-2000 sq. miles across tributaries of the Cumberland River from Fishing Creek in Kentucky to just below the Obey River in Tennessee. It inhabits current-swept rocky pools and adjacent riffles of creeks and small to medium rivers.

Population is believed to exceed 10,000; this fish is common. Number of recorded occurrences is 6-80, but is uncertain. Population is believed to be stable; change of less than 10% annually. Overall trend of the past 10 years is uncertain, but believed to be stable.

References

•	Harrington, R. C., and T. J. Near. 2012. Phylogenetic and coalescent strategies of species delimitation in snubnose darters (Percidae: Etheostoma). Systematic Biology 61:63-79.

•	Page, L. M., H. Espinosa-Pérez, L. T. Findley, C. R. Gilbert, R. N. Lea, N. E. Mandrak, R. L. Mayden, and J. S. Nelson. 2013. Common and scientific names of fishes from the United States, Canada, and Mexico. Seventh edition. American Fisheries Society, Special Publication 34, Bethesda, Maryland.

Etheostoma
Fish described in 2007